Mylothris rueppellii, the Rüppell's dotted border or twin dotted border, is a butterfly of the family Pieridae. It is found in most of Africa, south of the Sahara. Adults are on wing year-round, with peaks in October and from late February to April in southern Africa. The larvae feed on various Loranthaceae species, including Loranthus, Tapinanthus oleifolius and Tapinanthus rubromarginatus.

It is named after the German naturalist Eduard Rüppell, who had travelled in Africa in 1830.

Subspecies
M. r. rueppellii (highlands of Ethiopia)
M. r. haemus (Trimen, 1879) (southern Mozambique, Zimbabwe, South Africa)
M. r. josi Larsen, 1986 (Nigeria)
M. r. rhodesiana Riley, 1921 (northern Mozambique, Malawi, Tanzania, Zambia, southern Zaire (Shaba), south-eastern Angola)
M. r. septentrionalis Carpenter, 1928 (southern Sudan)
M. r. tirikensis Neave, 1904 (highlands of Uganda, Kenya and northern Tanzania)

Gallery
Images from gardens in Johannesburg, South Africa

References

Seitz, A. Die Gross-Schmetterlinge der Erde 13: Die Afrikanischen Tagfalter. Plate XIII 10

Pierini
Butterflies of Africa
Butterflies described in 1865